Mario Suryo Aji (born 16 March 2004) is an Indonesian Grand Prix motorcycle racer for Honda Team Asia in the 2023 Moto3 World Championship.

Career statistics

Red Bull MotoGP Rookies Cup

Races by year
(key) (Races in bold indicate pole position, races in italics indicate fastest lap)

FIM CEV Moto3 Junior World Championship

Races by year
(key) (Races in bold indicate pole position, races in italics indicate fastest lap)

Grand Prix motorcycle racing

By season

By class

Races by year
(key) (Races in bold indicate pole position; races in italics indicate fastest lap)

References

External links

2004 births
Living people
Indonesian motorcycle racers
Moto3 World Championship riders
People from Madiun